Line U4 is a line on the Vienna U-Bahn metro system.

Stations
Line U4 currently serves the following stations:
  (transfer to:    -  park & ride facility)
 
 
 
 
 
 
 
 
 
 
 
 
 
 
 
 
 
  (transfer to:   -  park & ride facility)
 

References

External links
 

U4
Railway lines opened in 1976